Minin and Pozharsky may refer to:

Separately
Kuzma Minin, (late 1570s–1616), a Russian merchant
Dmitry Pozharsky, (1577–1642), a Russian prince

Collectively
Monument to Minin and Pozharsky, in Moscow
Minin and Pozharsky Square, in Nizhny Novgorod
Minin and Pozharsky (film), a 1939 film